Ironworks may refer to:

Ironworks, a building or site where iron is smelted and where heavy iron and/or steel products are produced
The Columbus Ironworks building
Ironwork, artifacts or architectural features made of iron
Ironworks (record label)
Iron Works (2008), an album by American hip hop artist Ka
The Micromasters transformer